King Zwelithini Stadium is a multi-purpose stadium in Umlazi, a township south-west of Durban, South Africa. It is currently used mostly for football matches and was initially set to be utilized as a training field for teams participating in the 2010 FIFA World Cup after being renovated in 2010 and brought up to FIFA standards. However, since teams would be residing in the north of Durban, it was decided that King Zwelithini Stadium was too far away for practice sessions.

The stadium's capacity was expanded from 5,000 to 10,000 as a lasting legacy of the World Cup.

The stadium is named after the Zulu King Goodwill Zwelithini kaBhekuzulu.

References

Lamontville Golden Arrows F.C.
Soccer venues in South Africa
Sports venues in Durban
2010 establishments in South Africa